Thomas Wilfrid Wilkinson was the third Bishop of Brandon in Canada.

He was ordained in 1929  and began his career as Curate at Hudson Bay Junction after which he held incumbencies in Macklin and  Tisdale. From 1941 to 1945 he was a chaplain in the RCAF. When peace returned he was Rural Dean of Melfort  then Archdeacon of Dauphin. His last post before elevation to the episcopate was as Rector of St. Matthew's Cathedral, Brandon and Dean of Brandon.

Notes

Year of birth unknown
Anglican archdeacons in North America
Anglican Church of Canada deans
Anglican bishops of Brandon
20th-century Anglican Church of Canada bishops
Canadian military chaplains
World War II chaplains
Royal Canadian Air Force chaplains
Year of death missing